The 1938–39 season was the eighth season of competitive association football in the Football League played by Chester, an English club based in Chester, Cheshire.

It was the club's eighth consecutive season in the Third Division North since the election to the Football League. Alongside competing in the league, the club also participated in the FA Cup and the Welsh Cup.

Football League

Results summary

Results by matchday

Matches

FA Cup

Welsh Cup

Chester get a bye in the seventh round.

Season statistics

References

1938-39
English football clubs 1938–39 season